The Malaysian National Security Council (NSC) (Jawi: مجليس کسلامتن نݢارا مليسيا) is a federal agency under the Prime Minister's Department. NSC is the agency responsible for managing and co-ordinating the implementation of policies related to the security of Malaysia.

It is chaired by the Prime Minister of Malaysia and consists of the council's executive members, including the Deputy Prime Minister as deputy chairman, NSC Director General, three ministers (Minister of Defence, Minister of Home Affairs and the Minister of Communications and Multimedia), the Chief Secretary to the Government, the Chief of Defence Forces (CDF) and the Inspector-General of Police (IGP).

History
The 13 May 1969 racial riot incident raised the awareness of various parties on the importance of managing the difference and sensitivity that exists in a multi-racial community like Malaysia. Following this incident, the National Operations Council was established. MAGERAN's existence was to improve public safety, national defence and preservation peace for the general public, supplies and services critical to the nation. When the situation improved, MAGERAN was dissolved in early 1971.

The Government, nonetheless, felt that the existence of a body/agency responsible for the management of safety matters at the national, state and district level was needed as there were still communist threats and the relationship between the races was still fragile. On 23 February 1971, the Government established the National Security Council to co-ordinate policies related to the nation's safety and to provide instructions on safety including security movements, public peaceful and all matters related to safety.

The Office of the National Security Council Secreatriat was established to undertake administration and secretarial duties for the National Security Council. In 1995, the Office of the National Security Council was reorganised as National Security Division (BKN) where the State Security Secretariat Office and District Security Secretariat Office fell under the jurisdiction of the Prime Minister's Department and thereafter underwent a name change to State and District National Security Division. The National Security Division is responsible for the co-ordination of policies related to safety as well as to instruct on the necessary actions taken by related agencies.

On 24 July 2007, the National Security Division was once again reorganised and became the National Security Council, where the State Security Division became the State Security Council and the District Security Division became the District Security Council. The reorganisation was to ensure that the National Security Council carried out its function as a policy maker relating to national safety and to provide instructions on safety as a whole.

On 26 October 2016, a Special Operations counter-terrorism Task force was added under NSC as a response to global terrorism activity. The world first one-of-a-kind unit is a combination of Special Operations Force between Malaysian Armed Force, Royal Malaysian Police and Malaysian Maritime Enforcement Agency.

Core functions 
There are three core functions of the NSC, which are:
 Defending national sovereignty and strategic importance.
 Crisis and disaster management.
 Border management of land, maritime and air.

List of Directors-General of the National Security Council

Members

Permanent members

Alternate members

National Security Council Bill 2015
On Thursday, 3 December 2015, The National Security Council Bill 2015 was passed in Parliament after a marathon six-hour proceeding. The bill was passed quickly, taking two days to gain the majority vote, with 107 in favour and 74 against the bill. Among the contents of the bill are:

 Clause 18 (1): PM has full discretion to decide where 'security area' is
 Clause 18 (3) and (4): Initial declaration of ‘security area’ lasts for 6 months but may be renewed by PM indefinitely
 Clause 22–30: security forces can arrest without warrant; stop and search; enter and search premise; take possession of any land, building or movable property.
 Clause 37: All NSC’s affairs are done in absolute secrecy
 Clause 38: No action or lawsuit can be brought against the NSC

Unlike the Internal Security Act 1960 which requires the discretion of the Yang di-Pertuan Agong, the NSC bill is under the direct authority of the Prime Minister. Further, while the Prime Minister has to seek advice from the 8-man security council, he can choose to ignore the advice. The Malaysian Bar called the bill a "lurch towards an authoritarian government".

References

External links
 Majlis Keselamatan Negara website

1971 establishments in Malaysia
Government agencies established in 1971
Federal ministries, departments and agencies of Malaysia
Prime Minister's Department (Malaysia)
Malaysia